The men's high jump at the 2013 World Championships in Athletics was held at the Luzhniki Stadium on 13–15 August.

Thomas and home team favorite Ivan Ukhov couldn't make the height, while Derek Drouin set a Canadian national record clearing on his second attempt. World leader Bohdan Bondarenko confidently passed the height knowing it would require him to equal his world leading jump from the previous month and to break Javier Sotomayor's championship record. Drouin took his three attempts and settled for bronze. Bondarenko watched, then took three attempts at Sotomayor's world record.

Records
Prior to the competition, the records were as follows:

Qualification standards

Schedule

Results

Qualification
Qualification: Qualifying Performance 2.31 (Q) or at least 12 best performers (q) advance to the final.

Final
The final was started at 19:00.

References

External links
High jump results at IAAF website

High jump
High jump at the World Athletics Championships